KLS-13019 is a cannabidiol derivative that has been modified on the side chain to improve solubility and tissue penetration properties. It was developed and patented by Neuropathix subsidiary Kannalife and found to be 50x more potent than cannabidiol as a neuroprotective agent, thought to be mediated by modulation of the sodium-calcium exchanger channel. It also had a higher therapeutic index than cannabidiol. Both KLS-13019 and cannabidiol, prevented the development of CIPN, while only KLS-13019 uniquely reversed neuropathic pain from chemotherapy. KLS-13019 binds to fewer biological targets than cannabidiol and KLS-13019 may possess the unique ability to reverse addictive behaviour, an effect not observed with cannabidiol.

See also 
 7-Hydroxycannabidiol
 Abnormal cannabidiol
 Cannabidiol dimethyl ether
 Delta-6-Cannabidiol
 HU-320
 HU-331
 HUF-101
 O-1602
 O-1918

References 

Cannabinoids
2,6-Dihydroxybiphenyls
Cyclohexenes